Shea Homes is an American homebuilding company.  Founded in 1881, its major markets are the West Coast (California, Arizona, Nevada, Washington, and Colorado), Texas, the Carolinas, and Florida.

History
Shea Homes’ parent company, the J. F. Shea Co., was founded in 1881 in Portland, Oregon by John Francis Shea. In addition to being a new home builder, the J. F. Shea Company's activities include commercial construction, civil engineering, commercial and multi-family property development and management, construction materials and venture capital.

Donations 
In 2017, Shea Homes donated $11 million to Phoenix-area Catholic schools to be used for renovations and construction.

Awards
Shea Homes was named America's Best Builder in 2005 by Builder Magazine, 2007 Builder of the Year by Professional Builder and 2011 JD Power and Associates Customer Service Champion.

In popular culture
It has been the first sponsor of Curious George on PBS Kids.

References

Primary competitors
 Fulton Homes (in the Phoenix metropolitan area)
 Pulte Homes
 TRI Pointe Group

References

External links 
 

Home builders
Companies based in Los Angeles County, California
American companies established in 1881
1881 establishments in Oregon
Walnut, California
Construction and civil engineering companies of the United States